Tatlong Taong Walang Diyos is a 1976 Filipino period film written and directed by Mario O'Hara that set in the province of Laguna during the Second World War. The film stars Nora Aunor as the barrio lass Rosario, Christopher De Leon as the Japanese-Filipino army officer Masugi, and Bembol Roco as the army guerilla member Crispin.

The film was shot in Majayjay, Laguna where some of its townspeople would later serve as extras.

Synopsis
The film, set during the Japanese Occupation of the Philippines between 1942 and 1944, tells the story of Rosario (Aunor), a young schoolteacher engaged to be married to Crispin (Roco). Crispin leaves Rosario to fight the Japanese as a guerilla, and in his absence a Japanese-Filipino officer named Masugi (De León) rapes her.

Masugi later returns to Rosario apologizing for his act, bearing gifts of canned food and rice which Rosario at first refuses. Matters are complicated when Rosario's father Mang Andoy (Escudero) is arrested by the Japanese and Rosario reveals to Masugi that she is pregnant. Rosario must make a choice: accept Masugi's proposal to make her his wife (saving her father and ensuring a safe and stable life for her child), or reject him and the baby they have conceived together.

Plot

November 1941
On the morning of November 1941, Crispin goes to the school to see his lover, Rosario, who worked as a teacher. He tried to find Rosario somewhere in the area until he finds her in the garden watching on the plants but she was looking depressed because Crispin joins the Army due to the impending Japanese invasion that would happen sometime. As a response to his leaving, Rosario would pray for his safety and protection. Moments later at home, Rosario asks her mother, Aling Sion, about the rumors that the Japanese forces would invade the country sometime but her mother said that the Americans would never abandon the Philippines since the United States is a powerful country and also, they will never forget by God. The part ends with the scene of the whole class singing Jingle Bells as the footages of the Japanese attack on Pearl Harbor were shown and later, the whole family protects themselves from the bombardment and destruction by the Japanese forces in Clark Air Base and Cavite Naval Yard and their arrival in Manila.

1942
After the Philippines was conquered by the Japanese forces, many of the townsfolk decided to flee to the mountains due to the fears that the occupiers rumored that they will take advantage of making barbaric and inhumane acts towards the people. However, Rosario's family didn't flee because her father, Mang Andoy, believed that living in the mountains is very difficult. Her friend mentions the savagery of the Japanese for the civilians, she mentioned that they would throw babies and bayonets in the air and raping women but Rosario refuses to believe in those rumors. As the townsfolk continued to flee, Crispin and his fellow from the army came to visit Rosario and her family. During a conversation, Crispin reveals to them about what happened in Bataan that he witnessed where many soldiers were perished by any kind of brutality including starvation, bayonets, and shooting to death. Apparently, Crispin was one of the combined Filipino-American soldiers who were involved at the death march but he and his other comrades escape safely although some of them during the escape were killed instantly. Since he was one of the remaining soldiers alive, he decided to join the guerilla to continue their brutal mission to wipe out the Japanese army from the Philippine homeland. Rosario continues to pray to God for his safety as Crispin stays in their house for a while helping her family with their assigned tasks. They remain together until the time Crispin is going to leave for the guerilla army. Before he leaves, Rosario gave him a rosary and promises him to be safe there. Later at night, Rosario noticed her parents silently watched the bandits stealing their grains and pigs and thus, the beginning of starvation.

1943
The whole family gathered together for supper, eating sweet potatoes from their garden in which Lito always complaining about the same food that they ate for the whole day. While they were eating, two men (one Japanese-Filipino soldier and his Spanish-looking partner) arrived at the doorsteps of their household and as Mang Andoy opens the door, they entered and asking for directions on going to the next town. Since they were gone astray, the two need some refreshments, so Mang Andoy gave them lambanog. As their conversation continues, the two visitors introduced themselves as Masugi, a Japanese-Filipino officer, and Francis, his Spanish-looking best friend and collaborator. As Rosario tells them to finish and leave, Masugi starts looking at her and later, tries to seduce her. Mang Andoy attempted to grab her from him but he, along with his wife and son, was threatened to be shot by Masugi and Francis. As he did, Rosario escapes and Masugi chases her until the former was stuck in the empty pig-pen where Masugi starts to rape her. Afterward, they leave the house.

The following days, Rosario was traumatized from the day she was raped by Masugi and the whole family comforted her. Moments later, Masugi, donned in the uniform of the Imperial Japanese Army, arrives at their house again to give Rosario and her family some food and clothing as a way of making friends but Rosario refuses. The following afternoon, while Rosario is doing laundry in the river, Masugi shows up but she attacked her and flees as Masugi wants to talk with her. Rosario tells him that she is pregnant with their child and Masugi wants to marry her because he loves her.

Later, the whole townsfolk are attending the mass at the church but it was interrupted when the Japanese soldiers entered and surrounded every corner of the church. The mass attendees were silent until a woman unleashed a gun and shoots a Makapili member, causing the people to panic until the gunwoman was killed. Then, the Japanese Commander ordered that all women and children go outside and only men would remain including Mang Andoy. Rosario and her family were worried about her father being incarcerated inside the church. The following day, Rosario, who was visibly pregnant, goes to the church to visit his father and as she leaves, Masugi shows up as well as her mother, telling her to forget the past and Masugi is a kind man.

1944
The following year, Rosario gives birth to a baby boy. After giving birth, Francis reveals to Rosario about Masugi's life since he saw him being happy for the first time ever since. It is revealed that after the bombing of Pearl Harbor, his parents (Masugi is the son of the Japanese father and a Filipino mother) were caught by the authorities but Masugi was the only one to escape as he went to Francis for help. Francis hid him to evade being caught and then, he tried to bail his parents out of jail but it never came true as he reported that they were killed by the Filipino prisoners. This tragic event caused him to become sadistic and joins the Imperial Japanese Army where he told to Francis that in the war, "you must not think, fear God, and be human. Only animals last a lifetime."

The following morning, because of the trauma caused by Masugi from rape, she decides to kill the child by throwing in the nearby bridge but she didn't continue as Masugi found her in the place, primarily because of the innocence from looking at her child. Days later, Crispin pays a visit to Rosario but he was surprised and devastated when he found out that she has a child with another man. As Rosario tries to talk to him, he breaks his rosary (a promised thing given by Rosario) that he wore and leaves the house devastated and angry.

A week later, Rosario and Masugi are officially married as husband-and-wife with the presence of the former's family and the latter's commanding army officers. Later, they moved to an abandoned but spacious house in the town where they currently reside.

However, Rosario's family was massacred by the anti-Japanese guerillas for being a sympathizer for the Japanese forces although they denied the blame. Later in the cemetery, Rosario, with Masugi on her side, was devastated by the tragedy that killed her family. As they are on their way back home, they were ambushed by the guerillas. Back at home, Rosario goes to the basement and sees Crispin again. She wants him to go away because his group killed her family but Crispin said it wasn't their unit's fault. The short confrontation ended up with Crispin being unconscious. After few days of his recovery, Crispin is able to go somewhere as he was brought by Masugi to the open field. However, they wrestle each other until Crispin points his gun, threatening him for a future vengeance. Both men are telling the differences between the power of the Americans and the Japanese as Masugi told him that the war is for the wealthy.

Liberation, March 1945
The Americans have returned to liberate the country and the war becomes severely intense. As the bloodbath continues, Rosario, Masugi, and Francis evacuate from the town and seek escape to an Imperial Army truck. However, while the truck is en route to its destination, the guerillas unleash a counter-attack. As the people run for their lives, Francis was shot and died.

Later on, Rosario and Masugi, along with their son, seek refuge in an abandoned hut at the mountain where they will rest. However, at night, Masugi wakes up when he heard the noises from the outside created by the guerillas for psychological warfare. Unfortunately, Masugi was shot and killed by the guerillas and Rosario began to mourn his death. Before she and her son return to the town proper, she cremated his body by covering him with coconut husks since cremation is a funeral custom to the deceased Japanese people.

The following morning, Rosario sought refuge at the church as Padre Daniel tells her that the Americans will arrive soon and he plans to move to another town, along with her and her son. Later, he encourages her to pray, an act that she didn't do throughout the dark years of the occupation, according to him. As Rosario kneels and prays at the altar, a woman, who was also at the altar, began to recognize her and runs away telling the townsfolk that the traitor has returned and began forming an angry mob in every corner of the church. Rosario tries to escape but she was captured by the men and brought in front of the women holding scissors where they will cut her hair as a sign of shame. Padre Daniel, who tried to save her from the angry mob, became devastated and regretted it. As Rosario walks outside, a group of guerillas appeared at the entrance and starts executing her for shame.

The following day, Crispin returns to the town and starts finding Rosario but when he found her dead body at the same place where he found her nearly four years earlier, he began crying in pain. Immediately, he becomes the adoptive father of Rosario and Masugi's son after Padre Daniel transferred his care to him. The son of Masugi and Rosario, now the adopted son of Crispin, will never end up as a sadistic person like his father. The film ends with a blind man leaves the church, holding his unconscious brother to the outside as the group of devotees enter the church.

Cast and characters

Production credits
Mario O'Hara - writer and director
Nora Aunor - producer
Conrado Baltazar - cinematographer
Minda D. Azarcon - music
Christopher De Leon - executive producer
Antonia Villamayor - associate producer
Anastacio Villamayor - associate producer

Critical response
Reviews were very positive, with Pio de Castro III of The Times Journal in 1976 calling it "one of the best films" of the year. Film critic Noel Vera agreed, calling the movie the "greatest Filipino film ever made", and Vincenzo Tagle stated in 2012 that it "still remains unsurpassed".

Digital restoration
In 2016, ABS-CBN Corporation commissioned the film to be digitally restored and remastered by L’Immagine Ritrovata in Bologna, Italy as part of their ABS-CBN Film Restoration Project. The restoration of the film was supervised by Davide Pozzi. The restored version premiered at the 2016 Cinema One Originals film festival on November 15, 2016.

According to the ABS-CBN Film Restoration, the film was fully restored in L'Immagine Ritrovata, a specialized film laboratory in Bologna, Italy. The restoration team took 1,450 hours to eliminate all of the print's defects and obstacles found and according to them, it was probably their most difficult restoration to date. The surviving best print had virtually faded and lost not just color but even details. It was heavily scratched but the restored version was able to bring back much of the detail, clean up the images, and even bring back some of the colors.

There were two copies of film materials that were considered as sources for the restoration, a 35mm dupe negative and a 35mm print, both were borrowed from the Cultural Center of the Philippines (CCP). The other 35mm print was stored in Fukuoka City Public Library Archives in Fukuoka City, Fukuoka Prefecture, Japan but with burnt-in Japanese subtitles and the image quality was not clearer than the prints from the CCP. After a thorough test and assessment of available materials made by Ritrovata, the 35mm print was chosen as the film source for restoration. The print was dry-scanned in 4K resolution and converted to 2K resolution for digital restoration. The audio, taken from the sound negatives, was also digitally restored by the restoration team.

The premiere of the film's restored version was attended by Bembol Roco (one of the film's lead actors), Heber O'Hara (nephew of Mario O'Hara), and the staff of the ABS-CBN Film Archives. It is also attended by modern film directors Irene Villamor and Keith Sicat; actors including Rap Fernandez, Angel Aquino, Ria Atayde, Bernardo Bernardo, Karla Pambid, Ricky Davao, and Raphael Robes; and writers Mario Bautista and Juan Miguel Severo.

Recognitions

List of film festival exhibitions
1981 - Official Selection, Filipino Cinema Panorama, 3rd Festival Des 3 Continents, Nantes, Dec. 1–8
1995 - 2nd Asian Film Festival, Tokyo, Japan, December 18–19
2003 - Philippine Film Festival Fukuoka City, Japan, November 1–16
2004 - Asian Cinemas: “Fertile and Diverse,” National Film Center, The National Museum of Modern Art, Tokyo, May 19–26, 2004

References

Notes

External links
 
 Mario O'Hara's profile at UP Film Center web page
 Tatlong Taong Walang Diyos: A Love Story at Critic After Dark

Philippine drama films
Tagalog-language films
1970s Japanese-language films
1976 films
World War II films
Japanese occupation of the Philippines films
Films directed by Mario O'Hara